Sedang is an Austro-Asiatic language spoken in eastern Laos and Kon Tum Province in south central Vietnam. The Sedang language has the most speakers of any of the languages of the North Bahnaric language group, a group of languages known for their range of vowel phonations.

Phonology

Consonants

Vowels

Diphthongs

Sedang itself has 24 pure vowels: 7 vowel qualities, all of which may be plain ([a]), nasalized ([ã]), and creaky ([a̰]) and three of which /i a o/ may be both nasal and creaky ([ã̰]). While it does not have the length distinctions of other North Bahnaric languages, it has more diphthongs, between 33 and 55 vowel sounds all together. (The above set yields 50.) Sedang is thus sometimes claimed to have the largest vowel inventory in the world. However, other Bahnaric languages have more vowel qualities (Bahnar, for example, has 9) in addition to phonemic vowel length so the language with the record depends closely on how the languages are described and distinct vowels are defined.

References

Further reading

External links

Sedang Dictionary with English, Vietnamese, and French glossaries
Paul Sidwell's Mon–Khmer language information at the Australian National University.
Sound sample showing the distinction between clear and creaky vowels, from the link above.
Smith's dissertation 

Languages of Laos
Languages of Vietnam
Bahnaric languages
Kon Tum province